The Church of St Bartholomew in Oake, Somerset, England was built in the  13th century. It is a Grade II* listed building.

History

The first part of the church was built in the 13th and 14th centuries with the porch being added in the 15th and the upper stage of the tower around 1536.

The parish is part of the Deane Vale benefice within the Diocese of Bath and Wells.

Architecture

The red sandstone building has hamstone dressings.

The window in the north wall was brought from Taunton Priory. The font is Saxon, and the octagonal pulpit from the 17th century.

A large 150 year old cedar tree in the churchyard was blown over in 2014.

See also  
 List of ecclesiastical parishes in the Diocese of Bath and Wells

References

Grade II* listed buildings in Taunton Deane
Grade II* listed churches in Somerset